Volcán Escalante also known as "El Apagado" is a stratovolcano on the Chilean side of the border between Bolivia and Chile. It lies immediately SE of Cerro Colorado and SW to volcán Curiquinca, all of which are considered to be part of the Sairecabur volcanic group.

See also
 List of volcanoes in Bolivia
 List of volcanoes in Chile
 Sairecabur

References
 
 (Spanish)

External links
 SI Google Earth Placemarks - Smithsonian Institution Global Volcanism Program: Download placemarks with SI  Holocene volcano-data.

Volcanoes of Antofagasta Region
Mountains of Chile
Stratovolcanoes of Chile